Prigorodny is a rural locality (a settlement) in Barnaul, Altai Krai, Russia. The population was 3,025 as of 2013. There are 24 streets.

Geography 
Prigorodny is located 15 km southwest of Barnaul by road. Novosilikatny is the nearest rural locality.

References 

Rural localities in Barnaul urban okrug